St. Paul is a census-designated place (CDP) in San Patricio County, Texas,  United States.  The population was 584 at the 2010 census.

Geography

St. Paul is located at  (28.096973, -97.556883).

According to the United States Census Bureau, the CDP has a total area of 3.3 square miles (8.5 km2), all land.

Demographics
As of the census of 2000, there were 542 people, 179 households, and 136 families residing in the CDP. The population density was 164.5 people per square mile (63.6/km2). There were 209 housing units at an average density of 63.4/sq mi (24.5/km2). The racial makeup of the CDP was 75.28% White, 0.18% African American, 1.48% Native American, 21.40% from other races, and 1.66% from two or more races. Hispanic or Latino of any race were 65.68% of the population.

There were 179 households, out of which 32.4% had children under the age of 18 living with them, 57.5% were married couples living together, 12.3% had a female householder with no husband present, and 24.0% were non-families. 22.3% of all households were made up of individuals, and 14.5% had someone living alone who was 65 years of age or older. The average household size was 3.03 and the average family size was 3.59.

In the CDP, the population was spread out, with 27.7% under the age of 18, 9.8% from 18 to 24, 25.8% from 25 to 44, 23.8% from 45 to 64, and 12.9% who were 65 years of age or older. The median age was 34 years. For every 100 females, there were 110.1 males. For every 100 females age 18 and over, there were 103.1 males.

The median income for a household in the CDP was $25,750, and the median income for a family was $32,679. Males had a median income of $25,972 versus $23,864 for females. The per capita income for the CDP was $11,239. About 20.0% of families and 12.9% of the population were below the poverty line, including 8.4% of those under age 18 and 45.9% of those age 65 or over.

Education
St. Paul is served by the Sinton Independent School District.

References

Census-designated places in San Patricio County, Texas
Census-designated places in Texas
Corpus Christi metropolitan area